Collins Career Technical Center (also known as the Lawrence County Joint Vocational School District) is a public vocational career center providing adult and high school programs. The district's main campus is located in Chesapeake, Ohio, and a second campus is used for adult programs (primarily nursing) and is located in Coal Grove, Ohio. The district also provides STEM-based courses in many of the middle and high school buildings throughout Lawrence County, Ohio.

School Districts Served
Chesapeake Union Exempted Village School District (Chesapeake, Ohio) 
Dawson-Bryant Local School District (Coal Grove, Ohio) 
Fairland Local School District (Proctorville, Ohio) 
Ironton City Schools (Ironton, Ohio) 
Rock Hill Local School District (Pedro, Ohio) 
St. Joseph Catholic Schools (Ironton, Ohio) 
South Point Local School District (South Point, Ohio) 
Symmes Valley Local School District (Willow Wood, Ohio) 
Tri-State STEM+M (South Point, Ohio)

References

High schools in Lawrence County, Ohio
Public high schools in Ohio
Vocational schools in Ohio